The R.M. Knox House is a historic house at 1504 West 6th Street in Pine Bluff, Arkansas.  It is a two-story wood-frame structure, with a T-shaped floor plan and a cross-gable roof.  A mansard-roofed tower rises at the center of the house, and an elaborately decorated two-story porch extends across a portion of the front.  The house was built in 1885 for Richard Morris Knox, a veteran of the American Civil War.  It is one of the state's finest and most elaborate examples of the Eastlake style.

The house was built by C.J. Faucette, architect and builder.  The story is that Knox paid Faucette to build it with gold coins.

The house was listed on the National Register of Historic Places in 1975.

See also
National Register of Historic Places listings in Jefferson County, Arkansas

References

Houses completed in 1885
Houses in Pine Bluff, Arkansas
Houses on the National Register of Historic Places in Arkansas
National Register of Historic Places in Pine Bluff, Arkansas
Victorian architecture in Arkansas